The Niigata Albirex BB Rabbits are a basketball team based in Niigata, Niigata, playing in the Women's Japan Basketball League.

Notable players
Reika Takahashi
Saori Yoshida

Coaches
Kohei Eto
Tadaharu Ogawa

Practice facilities

Suibara General Gymnasium

Venues
City Hall Plaza Aore Nagaoka
Toyano General Gymnasium
Niigata City Gymnasium
Akihaku General Gymnasium
Region Plaza Joetsu
Ojiya City General Gymnasium
Tochio Gymnasium
Sakura Arena
Itoigawa Citizen's Gymnasium

References

External links
Official website

Basketball teams in Japan
Basketball teams established in 2011